Wyckoffs Mills is an unincorporated community located along the border of Cranbury and Monroe townships in Middlesex County, New Jersey, United States. Located at the intersection of Wyckoff Mills Road and Wyckoffs Mills Road, the area only contains lots containing residential structures; the remainder of the land is made up of farmland and wetlands. The Millstone River flows to the south of the settlement and a 500-kilovolt transmission line crosses the farmland to the north and south.

References

Cranbury, New Jersey
Monroe Township, Middlesex County, New Jersey
Unincorporated communities in Middlesex County, New Jersey
Unincorporated communities in New Jersey